William Bennest was a school principal from Burnaby, British Columbia, Canada who was arrested over allegations of sexual misconduct in schools in October 1996 and was indicted for the criminal charges including production of child pornography and sexual assault. The case stemmed from a police raid in September 1996 when the police found numerous videotapes and other media materials featuring child pornography in his residence.

The case lasted for two years and was widely discussed by the Canadian media. He later struck a deal with the prosecution and pleaded guilty on the charge of child pornography while the other charges were stayed. He received a lenient sentence, which led to considerable outrage among Canadians.

References

 Vancouver Province Friday, September 6, 1996 retrieved on April 15, 2007

Year of birth missing (living people)
Living people
People from Burnaby
Violence against men in North America